The 2000 Global Crossing @ The Glen was the 21st stock car race of the 2000 NASCAR Winston Cup Series and the 15th iteration of the event. The race was held on Sunday, August 13, 2000, at the shortened layout of Watkins Glen International, a 2.454 miles (3.949 km) permanent road course layout. The race took the scheduled 90 laps to complete. At race's end, Steve Park, driving for Dale Earnhardt, Inc., would manage to dominate the late stages of the race to win his first career NASCAR Winston Cup Series win and his only win of the season. To fill out the podium, Mark Martin and Jeff Burton, both driving for Roush Racing, would finish second and third, respectively.

Background 
Watkins Glen International (nicknamed "The Glen") is an automobile race track located in Watkins Glen, New York at the southern tip of Seneca Lake. It was long known around the world as the home of the Formula One United States Grand Prix, which it hosted for twenty consecutive years (1961–1980), but the site has been home to road racing of nearly every class, including the World Sportscar Championship, Trans-Am, Can-Am, NASCAR Sprint Cup Series, the International Motor Sports Association and the IndyCar Series.

Initially, public roads in the village were used for the race course. In 1956 a permanent circuit for the race was built. In 1968 the race was extended to six hours, becoming the 6 Hours of Watkins Glen. The circuit's current layout has more or less been the same since 1971, although a chicane was installed at the uphill Esses in 1975 to slow cars through these corners, where there was a fatality during practice at the 1973 United States Grand Prix. The chicane was removed in 1985, but another chicane called the "Inner Loop" was installed in 1992 after J.D. McDuffie's fatal accident during the previous year's NASCAR Winston Cup event.

The circuit is known as the Mecca of North American road racing and is a very popular venue among fans and drivers. The facility is currently owned by International Speedway Corporation.

Entry list 

 (R) denotes rookie driver.

Practice

First practice 
The first practice session was held on Friday, August 11, in the afternoon.

Second practice 
The second practice session was held on Saturday, August 12, in the morning.

Third and final practice 
The third and final practice session, sometimes referred to as Happy Hour, was held on Saturday, August 12, in the afternoon.

Qualifying 
Qualifying was scheduled to be held on Saturday, August 12, after numerous rain delays had delayed the session. However, rain would persist throughout Saturday, and thus, would cancel qualifying. In the case that qualifying is canceled, the first 35 spots are taken by the teams in the top 35 in owner's points. Then, the 36th spot is given to a champion who is not already in the field. Finally, positions 37-43 are based on the qualifying order that NASCAR had originally slated the drivers to go in in the case that NASCAR was to run qualifying. Out of the drivers who did not lock themselves in by points or a champion's provisional, the first seven in the order of those drivers would qualify for the race.

Bobby Labonte of Joe Gibbs Racing would win the pole, having the highest amount of owner's points.

Five drivers would fail to qualify: Boris Said, Scott Pruett, R. K. Smith, Brett Bodine, and Brian Simo.

Full starting lineup

Race results

References 

2000 NASCAR Winston Cup Series
NASCAR races at Watkins Glen International
August 2000 sports events in the United States
2000 in sports in New York (state)